Coral Gardens is the title of the 1978 English-language translation of German film director Leni Riefenstahl's Korallengärten, an illustrations book published in the same year in Germany. The book was published by HarperCollins in the United States. It is the first of two book collections of underwater photographs, followed by Impressionen unter Wasser (Impressions under Water) in 1990.

Overview
The book illustrations are the result of photos taken by Riefenstahl during her scuba diving trips in the Indian Ocean in  the 1970s.

See also
Impressionen unter Wasser

References

1978 non-fiction books
German non-fiction books
Books by Leni Riefenstahl